Gayane Chiloyan (born 27 September 2000 in Yerevan) is an Armenian sprinter. She competed at the 2016 Summer Olympics in the women's 200 metres race; her time of 25.03 seconds in the heats did not qualify her for the semifinals.

References

2000 births
Living people
Armenian female sprinters
Olympic athletes of Armenia
Athletes (track and field) at the 2016 Summer Olympics
Olympic female sprinters